Holidays is 2010 Malayalam film directed by M M Ramachandran (Atlas Ramachandran), starring Vinu Mohan, Rejith Menon, Muktha and Priya Lal in the lead roles. The film is about a few IT professionals, who arrive at Kochi and get entangled in a web of problems.

Plot
The story involves a bunch of youngsters Alby (Vinu Mohan), Janet (Muktha), Riya (Priya Lal),Soumitran (Rejith), Sudhi (Sudheesh) and a few others who are planning the elopement of Sudhi and his lover, since Sudhi's lover is about to get engaged to Vinod (Kalabhavan Mani) who is also a tough cop.
On the way they rescue a pretty young girl by the name of Lekha (Sruthi Lakshmi) from the hands of a few ruffians, but later find the girl murdered. They flee to a tea estate in Munnar, but the murderer is close at hand.

Cast
 Vinu Mohan as Alby
 Muktha as Janet
 Priya Lal as Riya
 Rejith Menon as Soumitran
 Sudheesh as Sudhi
 Sruthi Lakshmi as Lekha Paul
 Biyon
 Harishree Ashokan as Thangappan
 Kalabhavan Mani as Vinod
 Anoop Chandran as Veeramani
 Roopasree Asokan
 Anil Murali
 Karatte Raja
 Nimisha
 Urmila Unni
 Ambika Mohan as Vinod's mother
 Mini Arun
 Jolly

Production
The film is produced by T. Satheesh Babu, under the banner of Cinema Factory, and directed by businessman and chairman of Atlas Group, M M Ramachandran (Atlas Ramachandran). It is his first venture as a director, but he has produced certain critically acclaimed films like Vaishali, Dhanam etc., and has acted in films like Arabikatha, Anandabhairavi etc. According to him, the film is aimed at youngsters.

The filming occurred at various locations in India like Bangalore and Kochi and on foreign locales as Kuala Lampur.

Soundtrack

The original score and songs were composed by Alex Paul, with lyrics penned by Kaithapram and Santhosh Varma. The soundtrack received mixed responses. Nowrunning published a positive review commenting that "Alex Paul's music is the only fair thing in this film." Sify'''s review was negative saying, "Alex Paul’s tunes are pretty ordinary". They also commented that "A song pops out every other moment, which is almost always a dream sequence."

Release and reception
The movie was released on 12 November 2010, in thirty six theatres by Cinema Factory Release.

The film was met with nearly unanimous negative reviews. Several critics reviewed that the movie lacked a good script and the direction by the businn tycoon was worse than poor. A review by Nowrunning.com said that, "Holidays is a film that seriously lacks a few things, the most prominent among which would be a script that is worthy of being made into a film and more importantly some sensible direction." Sify'' reviewed the film saying, "With a ridiculous plot that has been presented as a thriller, Dr.M M Ramachandran’s Holidays is an amateurish attempt, to say the least. The script, visuals, music and the performances doesn’t help in making things better either."

References

External links
 
 Nowrunning article
 OneIndia article
 Sify review
 Metromatinee article

2010s Malayalam-language films
2010 directorial debut films
2010 films
2010s teen romance films
Indian teen romance films